The 2022 Diamond League was the thirteenth season of the Diamond League, an annual series of outdoor track and field meetings, organised by World Athletics. The competition was a revision to the top level athletics series since the Diamond League was founded in 2010. The number of Diamond Discipline events was 32, and the dual-meet final format was due to be replaced by a single final, which would have expanded the number of meetings to 14. A second Chinese meeting was added to the calendar. The reduction of events was aimed at allowing a standardized 120-minute television format for the series. Each meeting will host a number of Diamond Discipline events, only some of which would be broadcast. Events losing Diamond Discipline status would feature on the World Athletics Continental Tour, which will replace the IAAF World Challenge as the second tier of track and field meetings.

Schedule
The following thirteen meetings are scheduled to be included in the 2022 season.
On May 6, 2022, World Athletics announced that two meetings originally to be held in China were removed from the calendar. Kamila Skolimowska Memorial in Chorzow was chosen as an alternate meeting.

Results
 All results were taken from the official Diamond League website.
 Events held at Diamond League meets, but not included in the Diamond League points race, are marked in grey background.

Men

Track

Field

Women

Track

Field

Diamond League Final

Men

Women

References

External links

Official website

Diamond League
Diamond League